Rudrasena I was a Saka ruler of the Western Satrap dynasty in the area of Malwa in ancient India. During his reign, the Saka ksatrapas remained strong after a period of instability during the reign of Rudrasimha I.

Biography
He is mainly known from his coins. Several have a date in Brahmi numerals on the reverse (such as 142 Saka Era = 220 CE). The reverse shows a three-arched hill or Chaitya, with a river, a crescent moon and the sun, within a legend in Brahmi "Rajno Mahaksatrapasa Rudrasihaputrasa Rajno Mahaksatrapasa Rudrasenasa", "The great satrap Rudrasena, son of the great satrap Rudrasiha".

Reign
Rudrasena succeeded his cousin Jivadaman, who had no sons, as a ruler of the Western Satraps.
 

His sister Prabhudama was perhaps married to a ruler of Vaishali. After his death, the Malavas under their king Soma re-asserted their independence from the Saka satraps.

References

External links
Western Satrap coins

Western Satraps
3rd-century Indian monarchs
People from Ujjain